Hafiz Wala , is a town of Mianwali District in the Punjab province of Pakistan. It is located in Piplan Tehsil  at 32°16'0N 71°26'0E

References

Union councils of Mianwali District
Populated places in Mianwali District